Wallace William Ulrich (March 12, 1921 – April 7, 1995) was an American professional golfer who played on the PGA Tour in the 1940s and 1950s.

Ulrich was born in Iowa and raised in Austin, Minnesota. He attended Carleton College in Northfield, Minnesota where he was a member of the golf team. He won the 1943 NCAA championship; however, his college career was interrupted by service in the Marine Corps during World War II. Ulrich returned to Carleton after the war.

Ulrich won the Mexican Amateur in 1945. In 1946 and 1947, he won the Minnesota State Open as an amateur. He turned pro and joined the PGA Tour in 1948. His only tour win was the 1954 Kansas City Open. That same year, he became the fourth player in PGA Tour history to shoot a 60 when he had nines of 29-31 during the second round of the Virginia Beach Open. He went on to finish ninth at the event at Cavalier Yacht and Country Club.

Between 1948 and 1963, he made 183 PGA Tour cuts. Besides his victory, he was runner-up at the 1953 Canadian Open, losing by a stroke to Dave Douglas at Scarborough Golf and Country Club.

Ulrich died in Akron, Ohio where he had lived for 36 years.

Amateur wins
1939 Minnesota State Junior Championship
1942 Albert Lea Shortstop
1943 NCAA Championship
1945 Mexican Amateur
1947 Midwest Conference Individual Champion

Professional wins (11)

PGA Tour wins

Other wins
1946 Minnesota State Open (as an amateur)
1947 Minnesota State Open (as an amateur)
1948 RGCC Shelden Invitational
1949 RGCC Shelden Invitational
1950 RGCC Shelden Invitational
1950 Waterloo Open
1951 Minnesota State Open
1955 Minnesota State Open
1957 Iowa Open, Minnesota PGA Championship

References

American male golfers
PGA Tour golfers
Golfers from Iowa
Golfers from Minnesota
Golfers from Ohio
People from Austin, Minnesota
Sportspeople from Rochester, Minnesota
Sportspeople from Akron, Ohio
United States Marine Corps personnel of World War II
1921 births
1995 deaths